Bugulumbya Secondary School is a secondary school in the village of Busobya, Uganda.

History

E-School 
In June, 2005 it was announced that a consortium led by Hewlett-Packard would transform it into Africa's first NEPAD e-school. The project intends to equip the school with computers, Internet access and learning materials. It is also planned to set up health points to tie in with the NEPAD e-health program.

The e-school in Bugulumbya Secondary School was opened on 18 July 2005.

Organisation 
The school takes students from S1 – S6. The school has a roughly even split between girls and boys in S1 – S4, but males outnumber females by a ratio of approximately 4:1 in S5 and S6.

References

 IT Web article on school's inclusion in NEPAD project
 

Schools in Uganda
Kamuli District
Educational institutions established in 2005
2005 establishments in Uganda